The canton of Montluçon-4 is an administrative division of the Allier department, in central France. It was created at the French canton reorganisation which came into effect in March 2015. Its seat is in Montluçon.

It consists of the following communes: 
 
Lamaids 
Lavault-Sainte-Anne
Lignerolles
Montluçon (partly)
Prémilhat
Quinssaines
Teillet-Argenty

References

Cantons of Allier